The Worshipful Company of Needlemakers is one of the Livery Companies of the City of London. The Needlemakers were given Letters Patent by Oliver Cromwell in 1656, and received a Royal Charter in 1664. The Company gradually lost its role as a trade association, now acting as a supporter of the needle industry instead. Like the majority of Livery Companies, the Needlemakers' Company is also a charitable institution. 
	
The Needlemakers' Company ranks sixty-fifth in the order of precedence of City Livery Companies. Its motto is They Sewed Fig Leaves Together and Made Themselves Aprons.

External links
 www.needlemakers.org.uk

Needlemakers
1656 establishments in England